The 1956 Tulane Green Wave football team was an American football team that represented Tulane University during the 1956 NCAA University Division football season as a member of the Southeastern Conference. In their third year under head coach Andy Pilney, the team compiled a 6–4 record.

Schedule

References

Tulane
Tulane Green Wave football seasons
Tulane Green Wave football